NTRS may refer to:
 National Technology Roadmap for Semiconductors
 NASA Technical Reports Server